Tamara Grigorievna Abaeva (Тамара Григорьевна АБАЕВА) (born July 1927) was a Soviet historian. She was born in Khiva and studied at the National University of Uzbekistan in Tashkent (then known as SAGU or САГУ). She obtained her doctorate in history with a dissertation titled Essays on the history of Badakhshan. She was an employee of the Institute of Oriental Studies of the Academy of Sciences of the Uzbek SSR. She contributed to numerous historical works, her specialization being the history of the Pamir-Hindukush region of Afghanistan and that of Badakhshan.

References

1927 births
Living people
Soviet historians
People from Xorazm Region
National University of Uzbekistan alumni
Soviet women historians